In mathematics, a Clélie or Clelia curve is a curve on a sphere with the property:
 If the surface of a sphere is described as usual by the longitude  (angle ) and the colatitude (angle ) then 
.

The curve was named by Luigi Guido Grandi after Clelia Borromeo.

Viviani's curve  and spherical spirals are special cases of Clelia curves. In practice Clelia curves occur as polar orbits of satellites with circular orbits, whose traces on the earth include the poles. If the orbit is a geosynchronous one, then  and the trace is a Viviani's curve.

Parametric representation 

If the sphere is parametrized by

Examples 
Any Clelia curve meets the poles at least once.

Spherical spirals: 

A spherical spiral usually starts at the south pole and ends at the north pole (or vice versa).

Viviani's curve: 

Trace of a polar orbit of a satellite: 

In case of  the curve is periodic,  if  is rational (see rose). If  is a non rational number, the curve is not periodic. 

The table (second diagram) shows the floor plans of Clelia curves. The lower four curves are spherical spirals. The upper four are polar orbits. In case of  the lower arcs are hidden exactly by the upper arcs. The picture in the middle (circle) shows the floor plan of a Viviani's curve. The typical 8-shaped appearance can only achieved by the projection along the x-axis.

References 

 H. A. Pierer: Universal-Lexikon der Gegenwart und Vergangenheit oder neuestes encyclopädisches Wörterbuch der Wissenschaften, Künste und Gewerbe. Verlag H. A. Pierer, 1844, p. 82.

External links 
 Clelia.,  Mathcurve.com..

Spherical curves